Carl Vereen is a former offensive tackle in the National Football League. He was drafted in the fourth round of the 1957 NFL Draft by the Green Bay Packers and played that season with the team.

References

Players of American football from Miami
Green Bay Packers players
American football offensive tackles
Georgia Tech Yellow Jackets football players
1936 births
Living people